Zakariya Abarouai (born 30 March 1994) is a French–Moroccan footballer who plays for Saint-Priest. He plays as a striker.

Club career 

Abarouai made his Ligue 1 debut at 4 May 2014 against Stade de Reims in a 1–0 away defeat. He replaced Marco Ruben after 65 minutes at the Stade Auguste Delaune in Reims.

References

1994 births
Living people
Footballers from Lyon
French footballers
Association football forwards
Thonon Evian Grand Genève F.C. players
Ligue 1 players
French sportspeople of Moroccan descent
Association football defenders